Events from the year 1660 in Denmark.

Incumbents
 Monarch – Frederick III
 Steward of the Realm – Joachim Gersdorff (until October, office disbanded)

Events

 27 May – The Treaty of Copenhagen is signed, marking the conclusion of the Second Northern War.
 31 May – The Swedish troops depart from their camps outside Copenhagen.
 11 July – The city gates of Copenhagen re-opens and trade returns to normal.
 10 September – The estates gather at Copenhagen Castle to solve the financial problems faced after the wars and Frederick plays the different estates against each other.
 10 October – The 1660 Danish state of emergency is declared by the king with the purpose of putting pressure on the nobility, a move which proves successful.
 13 October – Bishop Hans Svane publicly offers the Heraldry Kingdom to  the annulment of the Håndfæstning, and the institution of absolute monarchy is instituted by decree.
 14 October – A Constituent Commission set up by the king meets for the first time to embark on the task of drawing up a new constitution but unable to agree it simply decides to cancel the existing Håndfæstning and leave it to the king to write the new constitution.
 17 October – Extensive celebrations pay homage to the new Heraldry King.
 4 November – The Chancellery and the "Geheime-statsrådet" are established.

Births

Deaths
 5 June – Anne Holck, noblewoman (born 1602)
 19 December – Ove Gjedde, admiral (born 1594)

References

 
Denmark
Years of the 17th century in Denmark